Jim Melchert (born 1930, New Bremen, Ohio) is an American artist best known for his ceramics and sculptures.

Education 
After earning an AB in art history from Princeton in 1952, he moved to Japan where he taught English for four years. Upon returning to the United States, he earned postgraduate degrees in painting at the University of Chicago (1957) and ceramics under Peter Voulkos at the University of California, Berkeley (1961).

Artwork 
Throughout his career, Melchert worked with many media, including painting, drawing, performance art, film, and most notably sculpture and ceramics. His unique process involves breaking down, drawing on, and reassembling ceramic tiles before painting the new constructions with glaze.

As part of the Nanette L. Laitman Documentation Project for Craft and Decorative Arts in America, Melchert donated his papers to the Smithsonian’s Archive of American Arts in 2004 and 2019–2021.

His work is held by in over two dozen collections, including the Rhode Island School of Design Museum, The Museum of Arts and Design and Los Angeles County Museum of Art.

Collections 

 San Francisco Museum of Modern Art
 Metropolitan Museum of Art
Stedelijk Museum Amsterdam
Los Angeles County Museum of Art

Appointments 

 1961–65 San Francisco Art Institute
 1965–92 University of California, Berkeley
 1977–81 National Endowment for the Arts Director, Visual Arts Program
 1984–88 American Academy in Rome, Director

Publications 

 The Ceramic Presence in Modern Art: Selections from the Linda Leonard Schlenger Collection and the Yale University Art Gallery by Sequoia Miller With an essay by John Stuart Gordon, 2015
 Shapes From Out of Nowhere Ceramics From the Robert A. Ellison, Jr. Collection

References 

1930 births
People from New Bremen, Ohio
Artists from Ohio
Princeton University alumni
University of Chicago alumni
University of California, Berkeley alumni
Living people